Domenico Del Giudice (born 12 December 2000) is an Italian footballer.

References

2000 births
Living people
Italian footballers
Association football defenders
Juventus F.C. players
U.S. Salernitana 1919 players